Josu Larrazabal has the role Head of Performance in the  cycling team.

References

Directeur sportifs
Spanish sportspeople
Living people
People from Arratia-Nerbioi
1981 births
Sportspeople from Biscay
University of the Basque Country alumni